Northern Ireland was a constituency of the European Parliament from 1979 until the UK exit from the European Union on 31 January 2020. It elected three MEPs using the single transferable vote, making it the only constituency in the United Kingdom which did not use first-past-the-post or party-list proportional representation.

Boundaries
The constituency covered the entirety of Northern Ireland, a constituent country of the United Kingdom. It was the only constituency in the United Kingdom the boundaries of which remained unchanged from the first direct election in 1979 until the UK left the European Union in 2020.

Members of the European Parliament

{| class="wikitable"
!Year
!colspan=2|Member
!Party
!colspan=2|Member
!Party
!colspan=2|Member
!Party
|-
|1979
|rowspan=6 bgcolor=|
|rowspan=5|Ian Paisley
|rowspan=6|Democratic Unionist
|rowspan=5 bgcolor=|
|rowspan=5|John Hume
|rowspan=5|
|rowspan=7 bgcolor=|
|rowspan=2|John Taylor
|rowspan=7|Ulster Unionist
|-
|1984
|-
|1989
|rowspan=8|Jim Nicholson
|-
|1994
|-
|1999
|-
|2004
|rowspan=2|Jim Allister
|rowspan=6 bgcolor=|
|rowspan=3|Bairbre de Brún
|rowspan=6|
|-
|2007
|bgcolor=|
|Traditional Unionist Voice
|-
|2009
|rowspan=4 bgcolor=|
|rowspan=4|Diane Dodds
|rowspan=4|Democratic Unionist
|bgcolor=|
|Conservatives and Unionists
|-
|2012
|rowspan=3|Martina Anderson
|rowspan=2 bgcolor=|
|rowspan=2|Ulster Unionist
|-
|2014
|-
|2019
|rowspan=1 bgcolor=|
|rowspan=1|Naomi Long
|rowspan=1|Alliance

Elections

2019

2014
Ten candidates stood in the election.

2009

2004

Gilliland's candidacy was supported by Alliance, Workers' Party, Labour and others.

1999

1994

Note 1: Campion's candidacy, with the ballot paper description 'Peace Coalition', was supported by Democratic Left, the Greens and some Labour groups.
Note 2: Kerr appeared on the ballot paper with the description Independence for Ulster.
Note 3: Mooney appeared on the ballot paper with the description Constitutional Independent Northern Ireland.

1989

Langhammer appeared on the ballot as the 'Labour Representation' candidate – the Campaign for Labour Representation aimed to persuade the British Labour Party to organise in Northern Ireland.

Caul appeared on the ballot as the candidate of Labour '87, a merger of the Labour Party of Northern Ireland, Northern Ireland Labour Party, Ulster Liberal Party and United Labour Party.

1984

1979

Bleakley appeared on the ballot paper with the description 'United Community'.

References 

European Parliament constituencies in the United Kingdom
European Parliament constituencies in Ireland
Euro
1979 establishments in Northern Ireland
Constituencies established in 1979
Constituencies disestablished in 2020
2020 disestablishments in Northern Ireland